The chi (Tongyong Pinyin chih) is a traditional Chinese unit of length. Although it is often translated as the "", its length was originally derived from the distance measured by a human hand, from the tip of the thumb to the tip of the forefinger, and is similar to the ancient span. It first appeared during China's Shang dynasty approximately 3,000 years ago and has since been adopted by other East Asian cultures such as Japan (shaku), Korea (ja/cheok), and Vietnam (thước).

In its ancient and modern forms, the chi is divided into 10 smaller units known as cun (the "Chinese inch"). 10 chi are equal to 1 zhàng.

Modern values
In the People's Republic of China, chi has been defined since 1984 as exactly 1/3 of a metre, i.e.,  . However, in the Hong Kong SAR the corresponding unit, pronounced chek in Cantonese, is defined as exactly  or 1 7/32 ft.
The two units are sometimes referred to in English as "Chinese foot" and "Hong Kong foot".

In Taiwan, chi is the same as the Japanese shaku, i.e., .

Historical values
Even earlier, during the Warring States era, the value of chi was essentially the same.

It is thought that the ancient Chinese astronomers also used chi as an angular unit; modern analysis of historical records indicates that it may have been equal to one degree.

In Guangzhou, however, the chi used for local trade varied from  – i.e., very close to the modern chek.

Usage in Chinese language 
Due to its long history and its widespread usage, chi (along with cun) has also seen metaphorical usages in the Chinese language. For example, chi cun, a word made up of the units chi and cun, refers to the dimensions of an object, while the idiom "dé cùn jìn chǐ" means "extremely greedy".

In informal use in China, chi is also sometimes used to refer to the US or imperial foot.

References

External links 

Units of length